White Lies may refer to:
 White lie, a minor or benign falsehood

Literature 
 White Lies (for My Mother), a 1992 non-fiction book by Liza Potvin

Music 
 White Lies (band), an English post-punk band
 White Lies (Deine Lakaien album), 2002
 White Lies (LoveHateHero album), 2007, or its title song
 White Lies (Mick Flannery album), 2008
 "White Lies" (Jason & the Scorchers song)
 "White Lies" (M-22 song), 2019
 "White Lies" (Mr Hudson song), 2009
 "White Lies" (Paul van Dyk song), 2007
 "White Lies" (VIZE x Tokio Hotel song), 2021
 "White Lies", a song by Girls Aloud from Sound of the Underground
 "White Lies", a song by Grin from 1+1
 "White Lies", a song by Man Overboard from Heart Attack
 "White Lies", a song by the Saturdays from On Your Radar
 "White Lies", a song by Stereophonics from Keep the Village Alive
 "White Lies", a song by Max Frost

Theater, television and film 
 White Lies (play) or The White Liars, a 1967 play by Peter Shaffer
 White Lies (TV series), a 2008–2009 South Korean drama series
 White Lies (1920 film), a 1920 American film directed by Edward LeSaint
 White Lies (1935 film), a 1935 American film starring Walter Connolly and Fay Wray
 White Lies, translation of Vita lögner, a 1995 Danish-Finnish-Swedish film directed by Mats Arehn
 White Lies (1996 film), a film directed by Ken Selden
 White Lies (1998 Canadian film), a film starring Lynn Redgrave
 White Lies (1998 French film), a film starring Marie Trintignant
 White Lies (2013 Indian film), a 2013 Indian film
 White Lies (2013 New Zealand film), a 2013 New Zealand film

See also
 White lie (disambiguation)
 Little White Lies (disambiguation)
 "White Liar", a 2009 song by Miranda Lambert